Alexander Shalamberidze (30 March 1958 – 1 July 2015) was a Georgian politician.

Career 
Shalamberidze was involved in the anti-Soviet Georgian national movement in the late 1980s. He was in office of the President, Curator to Imereti Region 1991-1991. 1992–2003 Executive Secretary of the political party Union of Georgian Traditionalists. Member of parliament, 5th Term of the Parliament of Georgia 20 November 1999 – 22 April 2004. Member of parliament, 6th Term of the Parliament of Georgia 22 April 2004 – 7 June 2008. 2009–2011 General secretary of the Peoples Party of Georgia. 2011–2015 general secretary of the political party Free Georgia. 2015 Shalamberidze was elected as the chairman of the Peoples Party of Georgia.

References 

   2.http://www.parliament.ge/en/mp/5426

Members of the Parliament of Georgia
1958 births
2015 deaths
Politicians from Tbilisi
20th-century politicians from Georgia (country)
21st-century politicians from Georgia (country)